The Great Revival, also known as Wo Xin Chang Dan, is a Chinese television series based on the conflict between the Yue and Wu states in the Spring and Autumn period. The Chinese title of the series is a Chinese idiom derived from King Goujian of Yue's perseverance in overcoming the odds to revive his fallen state of Yue and conquer the rival state of Wu. The series was first broadcast on CCTV-8 in mainland China in January 2007.

Cast

 Chen Daoming as King Goujian of Yue
 Hu Jun as King Fuchai of Wu
 Zuo Xiaoqing as Ya Yu
 Jia Yiping as Fan Li
 Wang Bing as Wu Zixu
 Ding Yongdai as Bo Pi
 Zheng Tianyong as Wen Zhong
 Ady An as Xishi
 Ge Zhijun as Shi Mai
 Chen Zhihui as Ling Gufu
 Zhao Shengsheng as Wang Sunluo
 Zhang Chenghao as Gongsun Xiong
 Sun Bin as Ku Cheng
 Gao Tianhao as Zhu Qiying
 Lu Yong as Yan Ying
 Su Ying as Hao Jin
 Yu Yang as Hei Yi
 Xi Yuli as Ji Wan
 Lu Guanting as Yuan Luo
 Liu Jialiang as Mo Buxie
 Wu Kegang as Jie Zibao
 Zhao Zihui as Zheng Dan
 Yang Xiaodan as Yan Zhu
 Zhang Ge as Xin Tian
 Ma Yong as Guan Sheng
 Zhao Yaodong as Crown prince Bo
 Xue Haowen as Crown prince You
 Zeng Hui as Prince Jiu
 Cao Huabo as Prince Bao
 Ma Jie as Jin Shi
 Rong Kuan as Xu An
 Wang Pei as Jia Yang
 Liu He as Si Nong
 Zhao Jian as Fuchai's vassal
 Shi Lei as Yu Yi
 Tian Hao as Jiu Bao
 Lu Shijie as Xin Buyi
 Miao Hongsen as Caretaker
 Yu Tongyun as Jin Xiang
 Wang Tong
 Chen Shibin
 Bi Tao
 Han Li
 Shen Jiandong

Guest stars
 Ma Jingwu as King Yunchang of Yue
 Yang Zaibao as Ge Lu
 Bai Dezhang as Ye Yong
 Hong Yuzhou as Wang Zilei
 Sun Min as Fu Tong
 Shi Lan as Tang Li

See also
 The Conquest (TV series)
 The Rebirth of a King

External links
  The Great Revival on Sina.com
  The Great Revival on Sohu

2007 Chinese television series debuts
2007 Chinese television series endings
Television series set in the Zhou dynasty
Yue (state)
Wu (state)
Mandarin-language television shows
China Central Television original programming
Chinese historical television series
Television series set in the 5th century BC